
Żary County is a unit of territorial administration and local government (powiat) in Lubusz Voivodeship, western Poland, on the German border. It came into being on January 1, 1999, as a result of the Polish local government reforms passed in 1998.

As of 2019 its total population is 96,496, out of which the population of Żary is 37,502, that of Lubsko is 13,921, that of Jasień is 4,309, that of Łęknica is 2,478, and the rural population is 38,286.

Neighbouring counties
Żary County is bordered by Krosno Odrzańskie County to the north, Zielona Góra County to the north-east, Żagań County to the east and Zgorzelec County to the south. It also borders the German states of Saxony and Brandenburg to the west.

Administrative division
The county is subdivided into 10 gminas (two urban, two urban-rural and six rural). These are listed in the following table, in descending order of population.

References

 
Land counties of Lubusz Voivodeship